CD33 or Siglec-3 (sialic acid binding Ig-like lectin 3, SIGLEC3, SIGLEC-3, gp67, p67) is a transmembrane receptor expressed on cells of myeloid lineage. It is usually considered myeloid-specific, but it can also be found on some lymphoid cells.

It binds sialic acids, therefore is a member of the SIGLEC family of lectins.

Structure 
The extracellular portion of this receptor contains two immunoglobulin domains (one IgV and one IgC2 domain), placing CD33 within the immunoglobulin superfamily.  The intracellular portion of CD33 contains immunoreceptor tyrosine-based inhibitory motifs (ITIMs) that are implicated in inhibition of cellular activity.

Function 
CD33 can be stimulated by any molecule with sialic acid residues such as glycoproteins or glycolipids. Upon binding, the immunoreceptor tyrosine-based inhibition motif (ITIM) of CD33, present on the cytosolic portion of the protein, is phosphorylated and acts as a docking site for Src homology 2 (SH2) domain-containing proteins like SHP phosphatases. This results in a cascade that inhibits phagocytosis in the cell.

Alzheimer's disease 
CD33 controls microglial activation but in Alzheimer disease it goes overdrive in presence of amyloid and tau proteins, its expression is known to be tied to TREM2.

Clinical significance
CD33 is the target of gemtuzumab ozogamicin (trade name: Mylotarg®; Pfizer/Wyeth-Ayerst Laboratories), an antibody-drug conjugate (ADC) for the treatment of patients with acute myeloid leukemia. The drug is a recombinant, humanized anti-CD33 monoclonal antibody (IgG4 κ antibody hP67.6) covalently attached to the cytotoxic antitumor antibiotic calicheamicin (N-acetyl-γ-calicheamicin) via a bifunctional linker (4-(4-acetylphenoxy)butanoic acid). 
Several mechanisms of resistance to gemtuzumab ozogamicin have been elucidated. 
On September 1, 2017, the FDA approved Pfizer's Mylotarg.

Gemtuzumab ozogamicin was initially approved by the U.S. Food and Drug Administration in 2000.  However, during post marketing clinical trials researchers noticed a greater number of deaths in the group of patients who received gemtuzumab ozogamicin compared with those receiving chemotherapy alone.  Based on these results, Pfizer voluntarily withdrew gemtuzumab ozogamicin from the market in mid-2010, but was reintroduced to the market in 2017.

CD33 is also the target in Vadastuximab talirine (SGN-CD33A), a novel antibody-drug conjugate being developed by Seattle Genetics, utilizing this company's ADC technology.

References

External links 
 

Lectins
SIGLEC
Alzheimer's disease